The West, sometimes marketed as Ken Burns Presents: The West, is a 1996 television documentary miniseries about the American Old West. It was directed by Stephen Ives and featured Ken Burns as executive producer. It was first broadcast on PBS on eight consecutive nights from September 15 to 22, 1996.

Production
Stephen Ives and Ken Burns had worked together on several previous series, including The Civil War (1990) and Baseball (1994). In 1988, Ives created his own production company, Insignia Films, and began working on The West as director, with Burns signed on to the project as executive producer. In order to create The West, the film crew traveled over  via airplane, conducted 72 interviews, visited 74 archives and collections, and filmed more than 250 hours of footage. Research consultants included Peter E. Palmquist, independent research expert on photographs of the period. The film's production was funded by General Motors.

Notable interviewees included historians Stephen Ambrose, J. S. Holliday, and Richard White; novelists Maxine Hong Kingston and N. Scott Momaday; environmentalists and writers Terry Tempest Williams and Marc Reisner; and politicians Ben Nighthorse Campbell, Ann Richards, Stewart Udall, and Ralph Yarborough.

Many notable actors lent their voices to The West, including Adam Arkin, Matthew Broderick, Ossie Davis, Keith Carradine, John Lithgow, Mary Stuart Masterson, Blythe Danner, the famous playwright Arthur Miller, Jimmy Smits, and Eli Wallach. The film's narrator, Peter Coyote, would later narrate ten more documentary films directed or produced by Burns, including The National Parks: America's Best Idea (2009), The Roosevelts: An Intimate History (2014), The Vietnam War (2017), The Mayo Clinic: Faith--Hope--Science (2018), and Country Music (2019).

Original airing
The West premiered on September 15, 1996, on PBS. The series was split into episodes, with one episode being aired each night for eight consecutive nights. Episodes were cut to about 90 minutes each in length, for a total length of over 12 hours for the entire series. The final episode aired on September 22, 1996.

Episodes

Home video release
When The West was released on VHS, the finale episode, "One Sky Above Us," was divided into two one-hour episodes, titled "Ghost Dance" and "One Sky Above Us." This VHS edition was released September 24, 1996. PBS later released a five-disc DVD set of The West on September 30, 2003.

Reception
The West was well received by both popular audiences and historians. Over 38 million viewers watched the series during its original airing, and it earned an average national Nielsen rating of 5.0. In 1997, the Organization of American Historians awarded The West its Erik Barnouw Award.

Film and television critics also responded positively to The West. Caryn James of The New York Times praised the series for its "enthralling detail" and authenticity, calling it "fiercely and brilliantly rooted in fact." Richard Zoglin of TIME judged the series "a sweeping, thoughtful, often moving look at America's conquest of the West", and Howard Rosenberg of the Los Angeles Times wrote that, "director Stephen Ives succeeds magnificently, delivering a lush work at once fully documented and fully entertaining... no one could ask for better television."

References

Further reading

External links

 
 

1996 television films
1996 films
PBS original programming
History books about the American Old West
1990s American documentary television series